Badalpur is a village located in the Gautam Budh Nagar district of Uttar Pradesh. It is part of Bisrakh Block and Dadri Tehsil. The village is the native place of former Uttar Pradesh Chief Minister, Mayawati.

Geography
Badalpur village is located in Dadri Tehsil of Gautam Buddha Nagar district in Uttar Pradesh, India. It is situated 5 km away from sub-district headquarter Dadri and 16 km away from district headquarter Gautam Buddha Nagar. Badalpur is the gram panchayat. The total geographical area of the village is 313.61 hectares.

Education

Colleges
Km. Mayawati Government Girls P.G. College
Km. Mayawati Govt. Girls Polytechnic

Secondary schools
Km. Mayawati Government Girls Inter College
Dujana Public School
M.H. Public School

References 

Villages in Gautam Buddh Nagar district